KRZ may refer to:
 Basango Mboliasa Airport, the IATA code KRZ
 Kerry Group, the Euronext code KRZ
 Kentucky Route Zero, a point-and-click adventure game
 ISO 639:krz, the ISO 639 code for the Nggarna language